The 2018–19 NACAM Formula 4 Championship season was the fourth season of the NACAM Formula 4 Championship. It began on 26 October 2018 at the Autódromo Hermanos Rodríguez in Mexico City and ended on 4 August 2019 at the same venue after seven rounds.

Teams and drivers

Race calendar and results

All rounds were held in Mexico. The first round was held in support of the 2018 Mexican Grand Prix.

Championship standings

Points were awarded to the top 10 classified finishers in each race.

Drivers' Championship

References

External links 

  

NACAM Formula 4 Championship seasons
Nacam
Nacam
Nacam
Nacam
Nacam